Carlos Watkins (born December 5, 1993) is an American football defensive end for the Dallas Cowboys of the National Football League (NFL). He played college football at Clemson.

Early years
Watkins attended Chase High School in Forest City, North Carolina. As a junior, he tallied 50 tackles (29 for loss) and 14.0 sacks.

As a senior, he made 15 sacks, one interception and 5 forced fumbles. He played in the Shrine Bowl and the U.S. Army All-American Bowl. He also lettered in basketball, averaging over 21 points and 10 rebounds per game as a junior.

College career
Watkins accepted football scholarship from Clemson University. As a true freshman in 2012, he played in nine games, recording 16 tackles (one for loss) and 3 quarterback pressures.

As a sophomore in 2013, he played in three games with one start, before being involved in a car crash which caused blood clots in both of his legs that ended his season. Watkins medically redshirted the rest of the season. He totaled 11 tackles (1.5 tackles for loss) and one quarterback pressure.

Watkins returned to play as a redshirt sophomore in 2014. He appeared in 11 games a backup, registering 13 tackles (2 for loss) and four quarterback pressures.

As a junior in 2015, he started 14 of 15 games, collecting 69 tackles (8 for loss), 3.5 sacks, and an interception, which he returned for a touchdown. He was named first-team All-ACC. In a critical game against the University of Notre Dame, he made a game-winning tackle on a last second two-point conversion attempt.

As a senior in 2016, he posted 82 tackles, 13.5 tackles for loss (led the team) and set the school record for defensive tackles with 10.5 sacks (led the team). He received All-ACC honors for the second consecutive year. On January 9, 2017, Watkins was part of the Clemson team that defeated Alabama in the 2017 College Football Playoff National Championship by a score of 35–31, with him making six total tackles. He finished his college career with 30 starts in 53 games, 191 tackles (26 for loss) and 14 sacks.

Professional career

Houston Texans
Watkins was selected by the Houston Texans in the fourth round (142nd overall) of the 2017 NFL Draft. The Texans acquired the pick by trading Brock Osweiler to the Cleveland Browns. As a rookie, he appeared in 12 games with 6 starts, playing defensive end in a 3-4 defense. He made 21 tackles (3 for loss) and one pass defensed.

In 2018, he appeared in 4 games and was declared inactive in 11 contests. He did not play in the seventh game against the Jacksonville Jaguars. He tallied 3 tackles (one for loss), one quarterback hit, and one sack. In the season finale against the Jaguars, he had 3 tackles (one for loss), one sack and one quarterback hit.

In 2019, he appeared in 10 games with one start, posting 23 tackles (one for loss), one sack, 2 quarterback hits, one pass defensed and one fumble recovery. He started and had 6 tackles (three solo) in the season finale against the Tennessee Titans.

In 2020, he appeared in 16 games with 11 starts, collecting 27 tackles (4 for loss), 2 sacks and 2 quarterback hits.

Dallas Cowboys
On March 22, 2021, Watkins signed with the Dallas Cowboys, to play as a defensive tackle in a 4-3 defense.

On December 2, 2021, Watkins intercepted a pass from New Orleans QB Taysom Hill and returned it for his first NFL touchdown.

On March 22, 2022, Watkins re-signed with the Cowboys on a one-year contract. He was released on August 30, 2022 and signed to the practice squad the next day. He was promoted to the active roster on October 22.

References

External links
Clemson Tigers bio

1993 births
Living people
American football defensive tackles
Clemson Tigers football players
Dallas Cowboys players
Houston Texans players
People from Cleveland County, North Carolina
Players of American football from North Carolina